Aksana Alekseevna Kavalchuk (born ) is a Belarusian former volleyball player, playing as an outside-spiker. She was part of the Belarus women's national volleyball team.

She competed at the 2009 Women's European Volleyball Championship. On club level she played for Indezit Lipeck in 2009.
She competed in the 2015 Women's European Volleyball Championship.

References

External links
http://es.scoresway.com/teams/belarus/?sport=volleyball&page=player&id=3362
http://www.cev.lu/competition-area/PlayerDetails.aspx?TeamID=7520&PlayerID=6919&ID=551

1979 births
Living people
Belarusian women's volleyball players
Place of birth missing (living people)
Opposite hitters
Expatriate volleyball players in Russia
Belarusian expatriate sportspeople in Russia